Andoni Gago Lopez is a Spanish professional boxer who held the European featherweight title from 2019 to 2021.

Professional career
Gago made his professional debut on 16 March 2012, scoring a four-round unanimous decision (UD) victory against Ryan Peleguer at the Frontón Bizkaia in Bilbao, Spain.

After compiling a record of 21–3–3 (6 KOs), he defeated Jesus Sanchez via twelve-round split decision (SD) on 8 June 2019 at the Bilbao Arena to capture the vacant European featherweight title. Two judges scored the bout in favour of Gago with 115–114 and 115–113, while the third judge scored it 116–112 for Sanchez.

Professional boxing record

References

External links

Living people
Year of birth missing (living people)
Date of birth missing (living people)
Spanish male boxers
Sportspeople from Bilbao
Featherweight boxers
Lightweight boxers
European Boxing Union champions